The white-crested hornbill (Horizocerus albocristatus), also known as the long-tailed hornbill, is a species of hornbill (family Bucerotidae) found in humid forests of Central and West Africa.

Taxonomy
There are three subspecies, which differ primarily in the amount of white to their head and neck and the presence or absence of white tips to the wing-coverts:

 Horizocerus albocristatus albocristatus (Cassin, 1848) – Guinea to the Ivory Coast.
 Horizocerus albocristatus cassini (Finsch, 1903) – from Nigeria east to Uganda and south to Angola.
 Horizocerus albocristatus macrourus (Bonaparte, 1850) – Ivory Coast and Ghana.

Range
The white-crested hornbill has a large range in West Africa, occurring from southern Sierra Leone, east to Benin including Côte d'Ivoire, Ghana, Guinea, Liberia, and Togo. It is frequent in parts of its range. Although its population is difficult to estimate, it is not thought to be threatened.

Gallery

References

External links

white-crested hornbill
white-crested hornbill
Taxonomy articles created by Polbot